Bhausaheb Bandodkar Ground (also known as Campal Grounds and Panjim Gymkhana Grounds) is a cricket ground in Panaji, Goa, India.  The first recorded match held on the ground came in 1966 when Gujarat Governor's XI played Maharashtra Governor's XI.  The first first-class to be played there came in the 1986/87 Ranji Trophy when Goa played Tamil Nadu.  Between the 1986/87 season and the 2005/06 season, the ground held 26 first-class matches.  The first List A match played there came when Goa played Kerala in the 1993/94 Ranji Trophy one-day competition.  Fifteen further List A matches have been played on the ground, the last of which saw Andhra Pradesh play Hyderabad in the 2004/05 Ranji Trophy one-day competition.

References

External links
Bhausaheb Bandodkar Ground at ESPNcricinfo
Bhausaheb Bandodkar Ground at CricketArchive

Cricket grounds in Goa
Buildings and structures in Panaji
Sports venues completed in 1963
1963 establishments in Goa, Daman and Diu
20th-century architecture in India